Cristóbal Hernández de Quintana (1651-1725) was a Spanish baroque painter, the most prominent representative of Baroque painting in the Canary Islands.

Biography 
Born in La Orotava (Tenerife) as the illegitimate son of a wealthy family from the neighboring town of Los Realejos. Cristóbal Hernández was welcomed and raised by a mulatta. At an unknown date he moved to Las Palmas de Gran Canaria where the June 15, 1671 he married María Pérez de Vera and only a year later, with little more than twenty years, he was already an apprentice in his workshop.

On the death of his mother in 1679 he returned to Tenerife where he took up residence in the city of San Cristóbal de La Laguna where he remarried María Perdomo de la Concepción in 1686. From this marriage they were born at least six children.

Among his major works include those of religious subjects as altarpieces and paintings. Highlights include the altarpiece of the ancient Basilica of Candelaria or paintings representing the Virgin of Candelaria and in 1724 the restoration of a painting of Juan de Roelas owned by the Cathedral of Santa Ana of Las Palmas de Gran Canaria.

He died in 1725 in San Cristóbal de La Laguna.

References 

17th-century Spanish painters
Spanish male painters
18th-century Spanish painters
18th-century Spanish male artists
People from Tenerife
18th-century Spanish people
1651 births
1725 deaths
Artists from the Canary Islands